Stützpunktleiter (Base Action Leader) was a Nazi Party political rank which existed between 1933 and 1938.  The rank was created as an adjutant position to the Ortsgruppenleiter of a German town or city.  In 1939, the rank of Stützpunktleiter was phased out and replaced by several new paramilitary political ranks.

References
 Clark, J. (2007). Uniforms of the NSDAP. Atglen, PA: Schiffer Publishing

Nazi political ranks